Karen Lamm (June 21, 1952 – June 29, 2001) was an American character actress and producer. She was known for Thunderbolt and Lightfoot (1974), The Unseen (1980) and Trackdown (1976). She was married to musicians Dennis Wilson and Robert Lamm.

Life and career
Lamm was born in Indianapolis, Indiana. Lamm co-wrote the Beach Boys’ song "Baby Blue" for the L.A. (Light Album) release and was featured as backup vocalist and songwriter on Dennis Wilson’s solo album Pacific Ocean Blue. Wilson drowned in 1983 in Marina del Rey, Calif., and Lamm subsequently contributed to many of his biographies, including the ABC miniseries The Beach Boys Story.

As an actress, Lamm was featured in more than 150 national commercials, TV movies, miniseries, series and films. She appeared in late 1974 in the Columbo-episode By Dawn's Early Light and six month's after that she co-starred in the Starsky & Hutch pilot-episode. 

She helped produce miniseries Menendez: A Killing in Beverly Hills and UPN series The Watcher.

Lamm died in June 2001 in Playa del Rey, California from heart failure.

Filmography
 The Dukes of Hazzard (TV series) (1984)
 The Unseen (1980)
 240-Robert (TV series) (1979) 
 The Power Within (TV movie) (1979)
 Tilt (1979) 
 A Last Cry for Help (TV movie) (1979)
 The Hardy Boys/Nancy Drew Mysteries (TV series) (1979)
 Coming Attractions (1978) 
 Almost Summer (1978)
 Christmas Miracle in Caufield, U.S.A. (TV movie) (1977)
 It Happened at Lakewood Manor (aka Ants) (TV movie) (1977)
 Police Woman (TV series) (1974–1977)
 The Night They Took Miss Beautiful (TV movie) (1977)
 Trackdown (1976)
 Starsky and Hutch (TV series) (1975)
 The Hatfields and the McCoys (TV movie) (1975)
 Columbo (TV Series) (1974)
 Thunderbolt and Lightfoot (1974)
 Kojak (TV series) (1974)
 Scarecrow (1973) 
 Harry O (TV series) (1973)

Producer
 Menendez: A Killing in Beverly Hills (TV movie) (co-executive producer)

References

External links
 

1952 births
2001 deaths
American film actresses
Actresses from Indiana
People from Indianapolis
20th-century American actresses